Shoot to kill may refer to:

Law
 Deadly force, a general concept in the theory of self-defence (where "shooting to kill" is aiming one's shots with the specific intention of causing fatal injury)
 Shoot-to-kill policy in Northern Ireland, under which suspects were alleged to have been deliberately killed without any attempt to arrest them
 Operation Kratos, a controversial British anti-terrorist policy
Postenpflicht, a general order at Nazi concentration camps requiring guards to shoot to kill

Film and TV
 Shoot to Kill (1947 film), a black-and-white film noir
 Shoot to Kill (1960 film), a British crime film directed by Michael Winner
 Shoot to Kill (1965 film), English title of Se sparo... ti uccido
 Shoot to Kill (1988 film), an adventure thriller film starring Sidney Poitier
 Shoot to Kill (1990 film), a drama-documentary on the actions of the police in Northern Ireland

Music
 Shoot to Kill, a mixtape by rapper Mickey Avalon
 Shoot to Kill (G-Unit album), an album by G-Unit eventually released as T.O.S: Terminate on Sight
 Shoot to Kill (X-Pistols album), a 2011 album by X-Pistols
 Shoot to Kill, a 2022 single by reggae band Dabbledob

Other
 Shoot to Kill (novel), a 2014 novel by Steve Cole
 Final Boss (Halo team), professional Halo team founded as Shoot to Kill (StK)